Will Joseph (May 10, 1877 – 1959) was a Welsh international rugby union player. He was a member of the winning Welsh team who beat the 1905 touring All Blacks. He played club rugby for Swansea and county rugby for Glamorgan.

Joseph was seen as the outstanding forward of the early 20th century Swansea team, during an excellent period in the 'All Whites' history. He was recognised as a strong player in tight scrums and due to his height, excellent in line outs.

International career

Wales
Joseph made his debut for Wales against England at Blackheath in 1902 at the age of 23. Joseph played in three Triple Crown winning campaigns, but his greatest moment on the field was when he played against the touring 1905 All Blacks in the famous Match of the Century. Joseph's international career fell apart in 1906 after a match against the touring Springboks. Although having played with great merit in an earlier match against South Africa with county side Glamorgan; in which he scored a try, Joseph was dropped after the international game. The Welsh pack in that game was dreadful and the selection committee decided to change the entire Welsh pack, regardless of individual play. Joseph's Wales career ended after 16 caps at the age of 28.

International games played
 England 1902, 1903, 1904, 1905, 1906
 Ireland 1902, 1903, 1905, 1906
 New Zealand 1905
 Scotland 1902, 1903, 1904, 1905, 1906
 South Africa 1906

Bibliography

References

1877 births
1959 deaths
Glamorgan County RFC players
Rugby union players from Morriston
Rugby union props
Swansea RFC players
Wales international rugby union players
Welsh rugby union players